The 2016 United States presidential election in Connecticut was held on Tuesday, November 8, 2016, as part of the 2016 United States presidential election in which all 50 states plus the District of Columbia participated. Connecticut voters chose electors to represent them in the Electoral College via a popular vote, pitting the Republican Party's nominee, businessman Donald Trump, and running mate Indiana Governor Mike Pence against Democratic Party nominee, former Secretary of State Hillary Clinton, and her running mate Virginia Senator Tim Kaine. Connecticut has seven electoral votes in the Electoral College.

Clinton won the state by 13.64%, a reduced margin of victory from Obama's 17.33% in 2012. Clinton carried six of the state's eight counties; however, this was the first time a Republican presidential candidate had won Windham County since George H. W. Bush in 1988. This was the first election since 1940 in which Connecticut did not vote for the same candidate as Michigan.

Trump's strongest county in the state was rural Litchfield County, while Clinton's biggest win was in adjacent, more urban Hartford County. Areas that swung in Clinton's favor were mainly concentrated in suburban Fairfield County, in towns like Darien, New Canaan, and Westport. This area is home to many New York City commuters. Other Democratic swings were in suburbs outside Hartford, such as Granby, East Granby, and Glastonbury, as well as outside New Haven, in towns like Guilford, Madison, and Woodbridge. This was the first time since 1888 that Darien and the first time since 1912 that Easton voted Democratic, largely due to opposition to the populist Trump among historically Republican affluent and educated voters. By contrast, areas that swung hard for Trump were mainly located in Windham County and northern New London County, in towns like Killingly, Sterling, Plainfield, and Voluntown. This mirrored a national trend of working-class support for Trump.

In addition, Trump became the first ever Republican to win the presidency without winning the towns of Granby, Madison, and Wilton, the first since 1872 to win without carrying Ridgefield, the first since 1876 to win without carrying New Canaan, the first since 1888 to win without carrying Avon and Greenwich and the first since 1908 to win without carrying Newtown.

Primary elections

Democratic primary

Three candidates appeared on the Democratic presidential primary ballot:

 Bernie Sanders
 Hillary Clinton
 Rocky De La Fuente

Opinion polling

Results

Republican primary
Four candidates appeared on the Republican presidential primary ballot:
 Ben Carson (withdrawn)
 Ted Cruz
 John Kasich
 Donald Trump

Opinion polling

Results

General election

Polling

Clinton won every pre-election poll conducted. An average of the final 3 polls showed Clinton leading 49% to 38%, and the final poll showed Clinton leading Trump 50% to 35%.

Statewide results

Results by county

Counties that flipped from Democratic to Republican
Windham (largest town: Windham)

Turnout
According to Connecticut's Secretary of State Elections Night Reporting website, voter turnout was 76.94% with 1,675,934 voters checked reported out of 2,178,169 Registered Voters Reported.

Results by congressional district
Clinton won all 5 congressional districts.

See also
 United States presidential elections in Connecticut
 2016 Democratic Party presidential debates and forums
 2016 Democratic Party presidential primaries
 2016 Republican Party presidential debates and forums
 2016 Republican Party presidential primaries

References

External links 
 RNC 2016 Republican Nominating Process 
 Green papers for 2016 primaries, caucuses, and conventions

CT
2016
Presidential